The Ohio State Buckeyes men's ice hockey team is an NCAA Division I college ice hockey program that represents Ohio State University. The Buckeyes are a member of the Big Ten Conference. They play at Value City Arena in Columbus, Ohio.

History
The Ohio State Buckeyes men's ice hockey program began in 1963, the team played at the new Ohio State Ice Rink, constructed in 1961. The Buckeyes were a founding member of the CCHA in 1971. The Buckeyes won the inaugural 1972 CCHA Men's Ice Hockey Tournament with a 3–0 win over Saint Louis University.

One of the team's most successful seasons came in 1997–1998, the year before the Buckeyes moved into new the 17,500-seat Value City Arena, which replaced the aging and undersized (1,400-seat) Ohio State Ice Rink. The team finished the 1997–1998 season with an overall record of 27–13–2. They secured an at-large bid to the 1998 NCAA Division I Men's Ice Hockey Tournament. That same season the Buckeyes advanced to the 1998 Frozen Four and lost in the semifinal game to Boston College 5–2. The 1998 tournament was the program's first of two all-time Frozen Four appearances, the other coming in 2018. In 1999 the team advanced to the 1999 NCAA Division I Men's Ice Hockey Tournament. Despite a first round elimination with a 4–2 loss to Maine, this marked the first time in school history the team made the NCAA tournament in consecutive seasons.

The time period during the early 2000s was the most successful period in the program's history. Ohio State made the NCAA Post season tournament in 2003, 2004, and 2005. The 2003–2004 season also saw the Buckeyes win the school's second CCHA post season tournament with a 4–2 win over Big Ten and CCHA rival Michigan. After three seasons, the Buckeyes returned to the NCAA Tournament in 2009, when they received an at-large bid to the 2009 NCAA Tournament after a 5th-place finish in the CCHA regular season and falling to Alaska in the CCHA Quarterfinals. In the 2009 NCAA Tournament the team lost 8–3 to Boston University in the first round.  The program was also invited to play in the Frozen Tundra Hockey Classic against Wisconsin on February 11, 2006, which was the second-ever outdoor ice hockey game played between college teams.

On March 21, 2011 the Big Ten Conference announced plans to sponsor men's ice hockey starting in 2013–14 season. Ohio State along with CCHA rivals, Michigan and Michigan State would leave the CCHA to join Minnesota and Wisconsin from the WCHA and Penn State, who would elevate their men's and women's American Collegiate Hockey Association club programs to varsity status, to form a six-team Big Ten Hockey Conference.

During the first half of the 2011–2012 season, the Buckeyes jumped out to a sizeable lead in the CCHA standings when the team recorded a 10–3–1 conference record. The second half of the season proved much harder for Ohio State when the team recorded an eleven-game winless streak through January and the first half of February. The team broke the streak with a 4–3 win over Western Michigan, the team's lone win in the second half of the season. The Buckeyes fell from a season high, second-place ranking in January 2012 to 21st place by the end of the regular season. In the first round of the 2012 CCHA Tournament, Ohio State was swept by Notre Dame 2–0 and 4–2 in the best-of-three series.

Despite an up and down 2013–14 season, Ohio State had a good showing in the inaugural Big Ten Hockey Tournament. After defeating Michigan State in overtime in the first round, the Buckeyes upset #1 Minnesota 3–1. They ultimately fell 5–4 in overtime in the championship game to the Wisconsin Badgers. Despite missing out on the NCAA Tournament, Ohio State would finish the 2013–14 season ranked #20.

After back to back losing seasons in 2014–15 and 2015–16, Ohio State had their first 20 win season and NCAA Tournament berth in 8 years. Led by forwards Nick Schilkey and Mason Jobst, the Buckeyes had the second ranked offense in college hockey and a historically great power play. Ohio State finished third in the Big Ten, their highest finish in the league's four-year history. Despite the successful season, Ohio State did not clinch a tournament berth until Penn State defeated Wisconsin in the 2017 Big Ten tournament, giving the Buckeyes the final at large berth and the 4 seed in the West Regional in Fargo, North Dakota. The Buckeyes faced off against the #2 overall seed, the Minnesota-Duluth Bulldogs in the 1st round. A third period comeback sent the game to overtime with the score tied at two. The Bulldogs ended the Buckeyes season on a goal from Willie Raskob at 11:58 of the first overtime.

Season-by-season results

Source:

Records vs. Big Ten teams
As of the 2021-22 season

Coaches
The Buckeyes are currently coached by Steve Rohlik. He was announced the new head coach on April 24, 2013 shortly after the departure of Mark Osiecki.

All-time coaching records
As of completion of 2021–22 season

† John Markell coached the final 9 games of the 1994–95 season after Jerry Welsh resigned.

Statistical leaders

Career points leaders

Career goaltending leaders

GP = Games played; Min = Minutes played; W = Wins; L = Losses; T = Ties; GA = Goals against; SO = Shutouts; SV% = Save percentage; GAA = Goals against average

minimum 30 games played

Statistics current through the start of the 2021–22 season.

Players

Current roster
As of July 21, 2022.

Awards and honors

NCAA

Individual awards

Derek Hines Unsung Hero Award
Brendon Kearney: 2019

NCAA Scoring Champion
Paul Pooley: 1984

All-Americans
AHCA First Team All-Americans

1983-84: Paul Pooley, F
1997-98: Hugo Boisvert, F
2012-13: Brady Hjelle, G
2013-14: Ryan Dzingel, F

AHCA Second Team All-Americans

1983-84: Perry Pooley, F
1998-99: Jeff Maund, G; Hugo Boisvert, F
2002-03: R. J. Umberger, F
2009-10: Zac Dalpe, F
2016-17: Mason Jobst, F
2017-18: Tanner Laczysnki, F
2018-19: Mason Jobst, F

CCHA

Individual awards

Player of the Year
Paul Pooley: 1984

Perani Cup
Brady Hjelle: 2013

Best Defensive Defenseman
Doug Andress: 2004

Ilitch Humanitarian Award
Mike Betz: 2003

Coach of the Year
Jerry Welsh: 1983
John Markell: 1998

Rookie of the Year
Paul Pooley: 1981
Brian Loney: 1992
R. J. Umberger: 2001

Terry Flanagan Memorial Award
Scott Titus: 2002
Tom Fritsche: 2007

Best Goaltender
Mike Betz: 2003
Brady Hjelle: 2013

Tournament Most Valuable Player
Bill McKenzie: 1972
Paul Caponigri: 2004

All-Conference Teams
First Team All-CCHA

1972–73: Ray Meyers, F
1975–76: Bruce Allworth, F
1978–79: Paul Tilley, F
1980–81: Mike Blake, G; Dan Mandich, D; Brent Morrow, F
1982–83: Andy Browne, F
1983–84: John Dougan, G; Paul Pooley, F
1997–98: Hugo Boisvert, F
1998–99: Jeff Maund, G; Hugo Boisvert, F
2002–03: R. J. Umberger, F
2009–10: Zac Dalpe, F
2012–13: Brady Hjelle, G

Second Team All-CCHA

1972–73: Jim Witherspoon, D
1976–77: Paul Tilley, F
1978–79: Steve Jones, G
1979–80: Steve Jones, G; Brian Jenks, D; Greg Kostenko, D; Rod McNair, D; Larry Marson, F; Paul Tilley, F
1980–81: Paul Pooley, F
1981–82: Larry Marson, F
1982–83: John Dougan, G; Dave Kobryn, F
1983–84: Perry Pooley, F
1984–85: Mike Rousseau, D
1995–96: Tom Sakey, G
1998–99: Andrè Signoretti, D
2002–03: Mike Betz, G
2004–05: Nate Guenin, D; Rod Pelley, F
2006–07: Sean Collins, F
2012–13: Tanner Fritz, F

CCHA All-Rookie Team

1989–90: Glenn Painter, D
1991–92: Brian Loney, F
1996–97: Hugo Boisvert, F
1997–98: Jeff Maund, G
1998–99: Jason Crain, D
2000–01: Dave Steckel, F; R. J. Umberger, F
2004–05: Tom Fritsche, F
2008–09: Matt Bartkowski, D; Zac Dalpe, F
2011–12: Max McCormick, F

Big Ten

Individual awards

Defensive Player of the Year
Sasha Larocque: 2019

Goaltender of the Year
Tommy Nappier: 2019
Jakub Dobeš: 2022

Freshman of the Year
Jakub Dobeš: 2022

Coach of the Year
Steve Rohlik: 2018, 2019

All-Conference Teams
First Team All-Big Ten

2013–14: Ryan Dzingel, F
2015–16: Josh Healey, D
2016–17: Mason Jobst, F
2017–18: Tanner Laczynski, F
2018–19: Tommy Nappier, G
2021–22: Jakub Dobeš, G; Georgii Merkulov, F

Second Team All-Big Ten

2015–16: Nick Schilkey, F
2016–17: Christian Frey, G; Josh Healey, D; Nick Schilkey, F
2017–18: Sean Romeo, G; Sasha Larocque, D; Mason Jobst, F
2018–19: Sasha Larocque, D
2022–23: Mason Lohrei, D; Jake Wise, F

Big Ten All-Rookie Team

2013–14: Christian Frey, G; Drew Brevig, D; Nick Schilkey, F
2014–15: Matthew Weis, F
2015–16: Mason Jobst, F
2017–18: Tommy Nappier, G
2018–19: Gustaf Westlund, F
2021–22: Jakub Dobeš, G; Mason Lohrei, D; Georgii Merkulov, F

Ohio State Buckeyes Hall of Fame
The following is a list of people associated with the Ohio State men's ice hockey program who were elected into the Ohio State Buckeyes Hall of Fame.

Hugo Boisvert
Jamie Macoun
Bill McKenzie
Paul Pooley
Paul Tilley
Jerry Welsh

Olympians
This is a list of Ohio State alumni who have played on an Olympic team.

Buckeyes in the NHL
As of July 1, 2022.

WHA
One Buckeye played in the WHA.

Source:

See also
 Ohio State Buckeyes women's ice hockey

References

External links

 

 
Ice hockey teams in Ohio
Big Ten Conference ice hockey
1963 establishments in Ohio
Ice hockey clubs established in 1963